IS 800 is an Indian Standard code of practice for general construction in steel. The earlier revision of this standard was done in year 1984 and the latest revision of 2007 was released on 22 February 2008. It is written for use in India.

External links
 IS 800
Indian Standard Codes for Civil Engineers

Standards of India
Structural engineering